Selkirk Lighthouse is located at mouth of the Salmon River in New York. It is one of only four lighthouses in the United States that retains its original bird-cage lantern.

Construction

Land for the Port Ontario Lighthouse Reservation was purchased from Sylvester and Daniel Brown by the Federal Government on September 1, 1837. Jacob Gould, Superintendent of Lighthouses on Lake Ontario, publicized for bids about a week after the purchase. The specifications included dimensions of the lumber and weight of the copper sheets, as well as the materials and dimensions of the house and an outhouse. There were eight lamps in the tower which originally burned whale oil.

The bid was awarded to Joseph Gibbs and Abner French, local contractors. Most of the stonework was accomplished by Jabez Meacham, using stone from a nearby quarry.  The wrought iron railings that encircled the birdcage lantern room were formed by John Box, a local blacksmith. The total cost was about $3,000.00.

Keepers
Lewis Conant, August 1838 – July 1849
Lucius B. Cole, July 1849 – October 1854
Charles M. Lewis, October 1854 – March 1857
A. H. Weed, March 1857 –  1858

Deactivation
Commerce was booming at the time the lighthouse was constructed. Two piers were built at the mouth of the Salmon River to improve the harbor. A canal was proposed to connect the Salmon River to Lake Oneida and the Erie Canal. Unfortunately, the canal was never built, and Selkirk faded in importance. With an official beacon no longer justified, the lighthouse was deactivated in 1858.

Selkirk Lighthouse Hotel
On October 16, 1895, Leopold Joh, a German émigré, purchased the lighthouse at auction from the US Government for $155. The lighthouse was first used as Joh's private residence before it was incorporated into a hotel complex that Joh started to develop in 1899. While on an errand procuring refreshments for his guests, Joh died of a massive coronary on August 21, 1907. His family continued to operate the hotel until it was sold to the Heckle family in 1916.

The Heckles eventually doubled the size of the hotel and the property attracted vacationers from as far away as New York City and Philadelphia. The  hotel and nearby marina was purchased by the Walker Family in 1987 and then again by the Barnell Family in 2014.  Multiple upgrades to the entire property have been made, including complete renovations of the Lighthouse and all 3 cottages, a new boat launch ramp and new state-of-the-art floating docks.

The former hotel, boarded up since an explosion in 1987, could not be restored and was razed in early 2016.

Reactivation
In 1989, a Coast Guard-approved solar light was installed in the lantern room. On August 6 of that year, the Selkirk Lighthouse was reactivated as a Class II navigation aid.

Other Remaining Birdcage Lights
Prudence Island Lighthouse, Rhode Island
Baileys Harbor Lighthouse, Wisconsin
Waugoshance Light, Michigan

References

Further reading
Oleszewski, Wes. Great Lakes Lighthouses, American and Canadian: A Comprehensive Directory/Guide to Great Lakes Lighthouses, (Gwinn, Michigan: Avery Color Studios, Inc., 1998) .

U.S. Coast Guard. Historically Famous Lighthouses (Washington, D.C.: Government Printing Office, 1957).
Wright, Larry and Wright, Patricia. Great Lakes Lighthouses Encyclopedia Hardback (Erin: Boston Mills Press, 2006)

External links
 
 
 
 Selkirk Lighthouse Website
 Lighthouse Friends

Lighthouses completed in 1838
Houses completed in 1838
Lighthouses on the National Register of Historic Places in New York (state)
Historic American Buildings Survey in New York (state)
Transportation buildings and structures in Oswego County, New York
National Register of Historic Places in Oswego County, New York
Lighthouses of the Great Lakes
1838 establishments in New York (state)